Artavasdes is the Hellenized form of the Iranian name .

People with this name include:

Persian satraps
 Artabazos I of Phrygia (flourished 5th century BC)
 Artabazos II of Phrygia (flourished 4th century BC)

Kings and emperors

Media Atropatene
 Artabazanes (flourished 3rd century BC), King of Media Atropatene
 Artavasdes I of Media Atropatene (flourished 1st century BC), King of Media Atropatene and Sophene 
 Artavasdes I, King of Media Atropatene and Armenia from AD 4 to 6, also known as Artavasdes III of Armenia

Armenia
 Artavasdes I (died 115 BC), King of Armenia 
 Artavasdes II (died 31 BC), King of Armenia 53 BC to 34 BC 
 Artavasdes III, King of Armenia and Media Atropatene from AD 4 to 6, also known as Artavasdes II of Media Atropatene
 Artavasdes IV, King of Armenia from 252 until 287

Characene
 Artabazos of Characene, a King who flourished late 40s BC

Byzantine empire
 Artabasdos (died 743), Byzantine Emperor of Constantinople who died in 743

Others
 Artabazes (military officer) (died 542), Byzantine soldier
 Artavasdes I Mamikonian, an Armenian sparapet
 Ardabast (Ardabastus), probably legendary son of Wittiza, Visigothic king
 Ardabast (Ardebart), Father of Erwig, Visigothic king